Papaipema cerussata, the ironweed borer moth, is a moth in the family Noctuidae. It is found in eastern North America, where it has been recorded from Georgia, Illinois, Indiana, Kentucky, Maine, Maryland, Michigan, New Jersey, New York, North Carolina, Ohio, Pennsylvania, South Carolina, Tennessee, Virginia and West Virginia.

Appearance
The wingspan is about 34–39 mm. Adults have bronzy forewings with violet grey AM and ST areas. The inner median area is reddish brown. The white-edged reniform spot is relatively small and narrow.

Host plants
The larvae feed on Vernonia noveboracensis.

References

Papaipema
Moths described in 1864